Costas Michael Takkas is a football administrator, the attaché to the CONCACAF president, and the former CIFA general secretary.

Corruption allegations 
Takkas was arrested in May 2015 in Switzerland to face corruption charges in the United States. He was banned by FIFA Ethics Committee.

Takkas was sentenced to 15 months in prison by a US judge in 2017.

Education 
Takkas obtained his designation as a chartered accountant from the Institute of Chartered Accountants in England and Wales in 1982, having earned his undergraduate degree from Imperial College London in 1978.

References

1957 births
Football people in the Cayman Islands
Living people
English people of Greek descent